Chrostosoma fassli is a moth of the subfamily Arctiinae. It was described by Max Wilhelm Karl Draudt in 1915. It is found in Bolivia.

References

Cahurel-entomologie

Chrostosoma
Moths described in 1915